Stadium 974 (previously known as Ras Abu Aboud Stadium) is a football stadium now slated for dismantlement in Ras Abu Aboud, Doha, Qatar, about 10 km east of Doha. Opened 30 November 2021, it is a temporary venue, made from 974 recycled shipping containers, that hosted matches during the 2021 FIFA Arab Cup and the 2022 FIFA World Cup, after which dismantlement began. It was the first temporary venue in FIFA World Cup history.

Design and construction
The stadium was designed by Fenwick Iribarren Architects. Constructed on a 450,000 square-metre waterfront site, it had a modular design and incorporated 974 recycled shipping containers in homage to the site's industrial history and the international dialing code for Qatar (+974). Some of the containers housed stadium amenities such as bathrooms and concessions. The entire structure is to be dismantled and is designed to be reassembled elsewhere; it was the first temporary venue in FIFA World Cup history.

The stadium was one of eight built, renovated or reconstructed for the 2022 FIFA World Cup. The procurement process for the stadium conversion began in 2017. The construction of the stadium involved HBK Contracting Company (HBK), DCB-QA, Time Qatar, Fenwick Iribarren Architects (FI-A), Schlaich Bergermann Partner and Hilson Moran. Fenwick Iribarren Architects said "the idea was to avoid building a "white elephant", a stadium that is left unused or underused after the tournament ends, as happened following previous World Cups."

The stadium received a four-star rating from the Global Sustainability Assessment System (GSAS).

History 
The stadium was initially announced under the name Ras Abu Aboud Stadium. During a launch event on 20 November 2021, the venue was officially renamed Stadium 974.

It hosted its first match on 30 November 2021 on the opening day of the 2021 FIFA Arab Cup, between the United Arab Emirates and Syria. The stadium hosted six matches during the tournament.

The stadium hosted seven games in the 2022 FIFA World Cup, including Brazil vs. South Korea in the Round of 16.

Future use
It was originally expected that the reassembled stadium would go to somewhere in Africa, but there are suggestions it may go to Uruguay, where it may be used for the 2030 FIFA World Cup if the Uruguay–Argentina–Chile–Paraguay bid succeeds.

Tournament results
All times are local, AST (UTC+3).

2021 FIFA Arab Cup

2022 FIFA World Cup
Stadium 974 hosted seven matches during the 2022 FIFA World Cup.

References

974
2022 FIFA World Cup stadiums
2021 establishments in Qatar
Sports venues completed in 2021
Portable buildings and shelters